Oluo is a surname. Notable people with the surname include:

 Ahamefule J. Oluo, American musician, composer, comedian, and writer
 Ijeoma Oluo (born 1980), American author

See also
 Olu
 Oluo Bozado, fictional character